Qaid-e-Tanhai is a Pakistani drama serial that aired on Hum TV from 22 October 2010 to 18 March 2011. It was written by Umera Ahmad and directed by Babar Javed. The drama serial was produced by A & B Productions.

Plot
Qaid-e-Tanhai is the story of a couple Aisha and Moiz who love each other. They want to marry each other but Moiz's mother Aliya gives a condition that if her daughter Maliha marries Aisha's brother she will agree. They marry each other. Then are separated due to family and financial pressures that Aisha's mother in law had on Moiz. Aisha did not want Moiz to go overseas insisting that the family isn't in any major financial trouble. Influenced by his mother Moiz goes overseas to earn money for his family anyway leaving Aisha devastated with her daughter behind. Oversees, although he is working hard in earning money he also befriends a female named Aneela. Moiz annoys Aisha by telling her about Aneela, and Aisha is mad at him. Aneela and Moiz are obviously dating at this point. Worried, depressed Aisha waits for Moiz to come to Pakistan to visit her but he does not come; years pass but he doesn't come influenced by his mother. In the meantime Noor is growing up, Aisha's daughter is fond of Jawad and thinks him as his father. The job Moiz was supposed to by raising his kids and being a support for his wife another man, Jawad does. Jawad eventually falls in love with Aisha and proposes her. She rejects, but is later softened by his talk. When she is overheard by her mother-in-law, she tells Moiz who comes to Pakistan, telling Aneela about Aisha who is mad at him for now telling about his marriage and child. But Jawad's mother rejects Aisha and he leaves her at the end time. Aisha goes to her mother's house where Maliha and her husband i.e. Aisha's brother insult her. Moiz in anger marries Aneela. He lies to Aneela that he has given divorce to Aisha. Meanwhile, Moiz's sister Maliha's marriage is fixed. Aneela calls Maliha but it is picked up by Aisha. Aneela throws Moiz out of the house. After 4–5 years she meets Moiz as Farhan their child wanted to meet his father. Aneela dies in a car accident and so Moiz goes to Pakistan. There he meets Aisha. Noor is a grown up but is rebellious. She hates her father. Moiz introduces Farhan to everyone. Meanwhile, Aisha and Farhan make a good bond. Moiz takes Aisha and Noor to London. In London, she is fine whereas Noor spoils all the photos in Farhan's room. She becomes more immature and challenging. Meanwhile, in Pakistan, Aliya feels sorry and thinks that once how she treated Aisha in a Qaid-e-Tanhai, she is also been treated in the same way by her other son Haseeb, Madiha and Maliha. Noor is admitted to a university and it is time for Aisha to leave UK.

In the last episode it is shown that Moiz asks for apology to Aisha and Aisha also asks for same. Moiz requests her not to go and she doesn't. They all (Moiz, Aisha, Noor and Farhan) are a happy family and are together.

Cast

Main
 Savera Nadeem
She is a good daughter of her mother and falls in love with her maternal cousin Moiz. She is able to marry Moiz and her mother is also happy although at first she shows some resistance. But it is Moiz's mother who hates Aisha and troubles her. She is being harassed by the whole family. She agrees on Jawad's marriage proposal by seeing his affection towards her daughter but then her mother-in-law starts torturing her. She is treated like a servant.
 Faisal Qureshi
He falls in love with Aisha. But his mother and sister oppose this marriage. Problems arise when he leaves for United Kingdom.
 Saba Hameed
Moiz's mother. She is the person who hates Aisha and creates differences between Aisha and Moiz. She doesn't see that Aisha is her sister's daughter and treats Aisha as a servant. Noor hates her because of her evil nature. She loves only her daughter
 Sunita Marshall
She is the second wife of Moiz. She likes Moiz but goes mad when she learns that he is already married. But Moiz marries her and they give birth to a child. She dies in an accident.
 Syed Jibran
He is being married to Moiz's sister. But due to his caring nature, Noor starts liking him and starts treating him like her father. Ayesha too starts falling for him. But when Moiz's mother listens a phone call she starts harassing Jawad, too.
 Neelam Muneer
She is Moiz's and Aisha's daughter. She is a disturbed child as she could never get her father's love. She hates her Dadi (Moiz's mother) and talks to her rudely. She starts liking Jawad and treats him like her father. She hates Moiz and Anila's son.

Supporting
Asif Raza Mir as Moiz's friend
Moiz's friend in London who respects Ayesha
Lubna Aslam as Maliha
Moiz's sister who marries Ayesha's brother. She is the principal troublemaker, even worse than her mother. She is adamant that her son marry Noor, but Noor declines.
Ismat Zaidi as Ammi/ Khala (Aisha's mother)
Aisha's mother, Moiz's khala and later mother-in-law of Moiz's sister. She hates her younger sister and warns Aisha not to marry Moiz not because she is conservative but because her sister is evil. She is a good mother-in-law but her strained relationship with her younger sister leads to problems in Aisha's life. She is shocked when Aisha says she will marry Jawad, but is happy when she learns that Aisha is going to the UK.
Farhan: Moiz and Aneela's son. He is a sober child. He wants to befriend his step-sister Noor and respects his step-mother Aisha.

Release

Broadcast
Qaid-e-Tanhai originally premiered on Hum TV from October 22, 2010 to 18 March 2011.

It was also aired in India on Zindagi from 28 September 2015 to 5 November 2015.

Digital release
 In July 2020, it was made available for streaming on Hum TV's Official YouTube Channel.

Awards and nominations

3rd Pakistan Media Awards
Nominated-Pakistan Media Award for Best TV Actress to Savera Nadeem
Nominated-Pakistan Media Award for Best Supporting Actress to Neelam Muneer

References

External links

2010 Pakistani television series debuts
2011 Pakistani television series endings
Pakistani drama television series
Urdu-language television shows
Television shows set in Karachi
Hum TV original programming
Zee Zindagi original programming